Antidote Films is a Brisbane-based independent film distributor, formerly known as Gil Scrine Films, specialising in arthouse films and social documentaries. Established in 1973 as a vehicle for distributing the documentaries of Gil Scrine, today the company is the Australian distributor for award winning films from all over the world.

History 

Faced with limited distribution options for his political documentary The Bad Society (1973) profiling the late Jim Cairns, producer Gil Scrine decided to distribute the film himself. He created Gil Scrine Films as the commercial entity to represent the film. The company continued to serve as theatrical representation for Scrine’s documentaries over the next decade; Home On The Range (1982), Buried Alive: The Story of East Timor (1989), Strangers In Paradise (1989), and A Thousand Miles From Care (1991).

In 1992 the Canadian producers of Manufacturing Consent: Noam Chomsky and the Media – an independent documentary in which noted sociologist and political dissident Noam Chomsky highlighted the deployment of propaganda by the corporations and the government of America – approached Gil Scrine Films for permission to use footage from Buried Alive. Being a small budget documentary the filmmakers were unable to pay royalties for the footage, instead striking a deal granting Gil Scrine Films exclusive Australian distribution rights for Manufacturing Consent.

The film was a success both at the box office and on home video and marked a turning point for Gil Scrine Films. The company shifted focus to acquiring the rights to local and overseas productions that had been overlooked by the mainstream distributors. No longer serving only to distribute Scrine’s own locally made documentaries, the company became a successful distribution company in the Australian market.

Since then the company has adapted to changing technologies and an unpredictable market, including the 2005 closure of two independent cinemas in Sydney that threatened the niche film market. Institutions of alternative and arthouse cinema, The Valhalla in Glebe remains empty while The Chauvel cinema in Paddington was given a lifeline and has managed to stay afloat.  While the struggles of the exhibitors “changed the landscape dramatically”, Gil Scrine Films has managed to remain a relevant player in the Australian film industry.

While particularly focused on social action and politically motivated documentaries such as McLibel (1998), The Corporation (2003), and A Crude Awakening (2006), the company also represents provocative fiction titles including Dinner Rush (2000), Head On (2004), and Sophie Scholl: Final Days (2005). The directive of the company remains to allow audiences access to films that are “too small or difficult or simply lost in the mad rush for the ‘new’.”

In 2010 Gil Scrine Films formally became known as Antidote Films, ending out the year as a recipient of Screen Australia’s Innovative Distribution program  with their proposal for VOD platform for education and library called Beamafilm.

Film distribution
Antidote Films distributes a range of documentaries and feature films including:

 A Crude Awakening: The Oil Crash
 A Good Man
 A Hero's Journey
 Art & Copy
 Bhutto
 The Boy who Plays on the Buddhas of Bamiyan
 Budrus
 Careless Love
 Coniston
 Erasing David
 Divided We Fall
 Drowned Out
 Four of a Kind
 Genius Within: The Inner Life of Glenn Gould
 Girl Clock
 Guerrilla: The Taking of Patty Hearst
 Guilty Pleasures
 Head-On
 Hope
 The House Keeper
 In Search of Beethoven
 In Search of Mozart
 Last Days Here
 Last Train Home
 Life and Debt
 Life In Movement
 Love at The Twilight Motel
 Make Hummus Not War
 Manufacturing Consent: Noam Chomsky and the Media
 McLibel
 Morris: A Life with Bells On
 Music of the Brain
 Pandora's Promise
 Position Among the Stars
 Prosecutor
 The Real Dirt on Farmer John
 RiP!: A Remix Manifesto
 Scared Sacred
 Son of a Lion
 Sophie Scholl – The Final Days
 Strange Birds in Paradise
 Tabloid
 The Burning Season
 The Choir
 The Corporation
 The Cove
 The Light
 The Miracle of Bern
 The Matilda Candidate
 The Most Dangerous Man in America
 The Snowman (1982 film)
 The Take
 The Triangle Wars
 The Weather Underground
 The Whale
 The Widower
 The Wild Parrots of Telegraph Hill
 Then The Wind Changed
 This Ain't No Mouse Music
 This Way of Life
 Unmade In China
 Up the Yangtze
 Waco: The Rules of Engagement
 Wagner & Me
 We Feed the World
 Whatever Happened to Brenda Hean
 Yes Madam, Sir

References

External links 
 Antidote Films website
 
 Screen Australia New Directions Stage 2 Review

Companies based in Brisbane
Film distributors of Australia
Documentary film organizations